Stirlingshire was a Scottish county constituency of the House of Commons of the Parliament of Great Britain and later of the Parliament of the United Kingdom from 1708 until 1918. It elected one Member of Parliament (MP) by the first past the post voting system.

Creation
The British parliamentary constituency was created in 1708 following the Acts of Union, 1707 and replaced the former Parliament of Scotland shire constituency of Stirlingshire.

History
The constituency elected one Member of Parliament (MP) by the first past the post system until the seat was abolished in 1918.

 For the 1918 general election it was divided into Clackmannan and Eastern Stirlingshire and Stirling and Clackmannan Western.

Members of Parliament

Elections

Elections in the 1830s

 After scrutiny, Forbes' election was declared void and Abercromby was declared elected

Elections in the 1840s

Elections in the 1850s

Forbes' death caused a by-election.

Blackburn was appointed a Lord Commissioner of the Treasury, requiring a by-election.

Elections in the 1860s

Elections in the 1870s

Elections in the 1880s

Elections in the 1890s

Elections in the 1900s

Elections in the 1910s

General Election 1914–15:

Another General Election was required to take place before the end of 1915. The political parties had been making preparations for an election to take place and by the July 1914, the following candidates had been selected; 
Liberal: William Chapple
Unionist: Andrew B. King

References 

Historic parliamentary constituencies in Scotland (Westminster)
Constituencies of the Parliament of the United Kingdom disestablished in 1918
Constituencies of the Parliament of the United Kingdom established in 1708
Stirlingshire